Hedwig Swimberghe is a Belgian clarinetist, leading the Brussels Clarinet choir, and teaching at the Royal Conservatory of Brussels.

References

Belgian classical clarinetists
Living people
21st-century clarinetists
Year of birth missing (living people)